Contrafreeloading is an observed behavior in which an organism, when offered a choice between provided food or food that requires effort to obtain, prefers the food that requires effort.

The term was coined in 1963 by animal psychologist Glen Jensen. In his original study, around 200 rats were given a choice between food in a bowl and a food dispenser which required that the rat step on the pedal a set number of times. In this experiment, Jensen found that the rats chose the foot pedal option as a function of the number of foot presses required to receive the food reward. Similar studies by Jensen and other researchers have since replicated his findings with gerbils and other animals including canines, mice, rats, birds, fish, monkeys and chimpanzees. The only animal that did not display similar behavior was the domesticated cat, which preferred to be served.

References

Sources 
 The Free Food (contrafreeloading) Phenomenon: A Review and analysis

Ethology